The Chimney Sweepers and Chimneys Regulation Act 1840 was a British Act of Parliament passed to try to stop child labour. Many boys as young as six were being used as chimney sweeps. One of many chimney sweeps such as Newport, Isle of Wight's Valentine Grey, a 10-year-old, who was murdered by his Master Benjamin Davis, because he hadn't cleaned a chimney properly, forced the passing of the "Climbing Boys Act"

This act prohibited any person under 21 being compelled or knowingly allowed to ascend or descend a chimney or flue for sweeping, cleaning or coring.

References

United Kingdom Acts of Parliament 1840
United Kingdom labour law
Child labour law
1840 in labor relations
Chimney sweeps